A referendum on prohibition was held in Finland on 29 and 30 December 1931. Voters were asked whether they approved of the continuation of the prohibition law passed in 1919. Of the three options presented, the complete abolition of prohibition was backed by 70.5% of voters with a turnout of only 44.4%.

Support for prohibition was stronger among women than men, and stronger in rural areas than in cities. Turnout for men (53%) was significantly higher than for women (37%), while turnout in cities (54%) was higher than in rural areas (42%). The ballots used by men and women were different colours.

Results

References

Finland
1931 in Finland
Referendums in Finland
Prohibition referendums
December 1931 events
Multiple-choice referendums